The men's individual competition of the archery events at the 2013 Mediterranean Games was held between June 22 and 24 at the Macit Özcan Sports Complex.

Schedule
All times are Eastern European Summer Time (UTC+3).

Results

Ranking round

Competition rounds

Finals

Section 1

Section 2

References

2013